Lim Peng Siang (also known as Lin Bengxian; 1872–1944) was a businessperson in Singapore and Malaya. Together with his brother Lim Peng Mau (Lin Bingmao), he founded the Ho Hong Group of companies in 1904, which had interests in banking, shipping, parboiled rice, oil mills, cement, coconut and other businesses. He was a President of the Singapore Chinese Chamber of Commerce and a member of the Chinese Advisory Board. Peng Siang Quay in Singapore is named after him.

Early life and education
Lim was the son of Lim Ho Puah. His mother was the only daughter of Wee Bin, the founder of Wee Bin & Co. He was born in Amoy, Fujian, China in 1872. After receiving his education in Chinese, he travelled to Singapore when he was still very young. Like his father, Lim was naturalised as a British subject, in 1902. He received private tuition in English and was a student at the St. Joseph's Institution.

Career 
Lim  joined the firm of Wee Bin & Co., which was then under the management of his father, and eventually rose to its head before setting out to start the Ho Hong Group. He took over the greater part of the firm's business, including the large steamships, when the firm of Wee Bin & Co. was liquidated in 1911

In 1914, Lim founded the Ho Hong Steamship Company Ltd. He sold most of his shares in Ho Hong Steamship to the Oversea Chinese Banking Corporation in 1936.

Lim founded the Chinese Commercial Bank in 1912 together with other members of the Singapore Hokkien business community. Together with Lim Boon Keng, Seow Poh Leng and others, he founded the Ho Hong Bank in 1917. In 1932, Chinese Commercial Bank and Ho Hong Bank merged with the Oversea-Chinese Bank to form the Oversea-Chinese Banking Corporation.

By the 1910s, Ho Hong Group was the most diversified group of companies in Malaya. Companies in the group founded by Lim included Ho Hong Steamship Co. Ltd., Ho Hong Oil Mills Ltd., Ho Hong Parboiled Rice Mill, Ho Hong Bank Ltd., and the Ho Hong Portland Cement Works Ltd. He also had plans for a bucket-making factory, and for the reclamation and development of several big pieces of swampy land in a big industrial area in the immediate neighbourhood of Singapore Town.

Public life
Lim was involved in the formation of the Singapore Chinese Chamber of Commerce, and was its President from 1913 to 1916, except for 1914 when he was Vice President. He was a member of the Chinese Advisory Board between 1921 and 1941, as one of the representatives of the Hokkien community. Along with his brother, he was an honourable chairperson of the Hong Kong Fujian Chamber of Commerce between 1930 and 1941. 

Lim was also a director of a number of public companies, including the Central Engine Works Ltd. and the Central Motors Ltd. He was also a Justice of the Peace.

In his later years, he was less active in public life, and declined the offer of a seat on the Legislative Council several times, in order to concentrate on his industrial work.

Benefactor

References

Further reading
 
 Asian Culture 28 (June 2004) by Singapore Society of Asian Studies: In the 28th issue of the journal of Singapore Society of Asian Studies, the essays in English discuss Lim Peng Siang and the building of the Ho Hong Empire in colonial Singapore.
 Seaports of the Far East: Historical and Descriptive, Commercial and Industrial, Facts, Figures, & Resources By Allister Macmillan Compiled by Allister Macmillan Published by W.H. & L. Collingridge, 1925; p. 441
 
 The Dominions Office and Colonial Office List for 1928 by Great Britain Office of Commonwealth Relations – Page 418
 The Dominions Office and Colonial Office List for 1929 by Great Britain Office of Commonwealth Relations – Page 431
 The Ship Compendium & Year Book Published by Compendiums Ltd., 1922; Item notes: 1922; Page 262
 
 Sociétés et compagnies de commerce en Orient et dans l'océan Indien: actes du huitième Colloque international d'histoire maritime (Beyrouth, 5–10 septembre 1966). By Michel Mollat Published by S.E.V.P.E.N., 1966; p. 696
 
 Shinozaki 1982: 40–50

1872 births
1944 deaths
Chinese bankers
Businesspeople from Fujian
People from Xiamen